John B. Maberry (December 17, 1841 – December 17, 1922) was an American Civil War Medal of Honor recipient from Smyrna, Delaware, who served in the United States Army as a sergeant in Company F of 1st Delaware Infantry.  His citation was awarded for his service as a private during the Battle of Gettysburg on July 3, 1863 and reads "Capture of flag."

See also

 List of Medal of Honor recipients for the Battle of Gettysburg
 List of American Civil War Medal of Honor recipients: M–P

External links
 
 

1841 births
1922 deaths
Union Army soldiers
United States Army Medal of Honor recipients
People from Smyrna, Delaware
People of Delaware in the American Civil War
American Civil War recipients of the Medal of Honor